Russian pair Svetlana Kuznetsova and Vera Zvonareva were the defending champions, but Zvonareva decided not to participate due to injury. Kuznetsova partnered up with Yanina Wickmayer but they lost in the second round to Nuria Llagostera Vives and Zheng Jie.

Top seeds Sara Errani and Roberta Vinci won the title, defeating wild cards Ashleigh Barty and Casey Dellacqua in the final, 6–2, 3–6, 6–2.

Seeds

Draw

Finals

Top half

Section 1

Section 2

Bottom half

Section 3

Section 4

External links
 2013 Australian Open – Women's draws and results at the International Tennis Federation

Women's Doubles
Australian Open (tennis) by year – Women's doubles
2013 in Australian women's sport